The name Mubarak Mosque (English: “Mosque of the blessed”) may refer to:

 Mubarak Mosque (An Giang), Vietnam
 Mubarak Mosque (Qadian), Punjab, India
 Mubarak Mosque (Tilford), England

 Moubarak Mosque, Val-d'Oise (Masjid Moubarak), France
 Mobarak Mosque (The Hague), Netherlands

See also
 Mubarak (disambiguation)